Still Standing may refer to:

Music

Albums
 Still Standing (Goodie Mob album) or the title song, 1998
 Still Standing (Jason & the Scorchers album), 1986
 Still Standing (Monica album) or the title song (see below), 2010
 Still Standing, by Deadly Venoms, 2002
 Still Standing, by Exile, 1990
 Still Standing, by the Martins, 2018
 Still Standing, an EP by Yellowcard, 2000

Songs
 "Still Standing" (Hilltop Hoods song), 2009
 "Still Standing" (Monica song), 2008
 "Still Standing", by Kylie Minogue from Body Language, 2003
 "Still Standing", by the Rasmus from Dead Letters, 2003

Television
 Still Standing (American TV series), a 2002–2006 sitcom
 Still Standing (Canadian TV series), a comedy/reality show that premiered in 2015
 Monica: Still Standing, a 2009–2010 American reality series
 "Still Standing" (Fear the Walking Dead), an episode

See also
 "I'm Still Standing", a 1983 song by Elton John
 I'm Still Standing (book), a 2012 autobiography by Fabrice Muamba
 Still Standing Up, a 1997 EP by the Bruisers
 Standing Still (disambiguation)
 Who's Still Standing?, an American adaptation of the Israeli game show La'uf al HaMillion